Hirotaka Mita (三田 啓貴, born September 14, 1990) is a Japanese professional footballer who plays as an attacking midfielder for  club Yokohama FC.

Club statistics
.

Honours

Club
FC Tokyo
J.League Cup: 2020

References

External links
Profile at Yokohama FC
Profile at Vissel Kobe

Profile at Vegalta Sendai

1990 births
Living people
Meiji University alumni
Association football people from Tokyo
Japanese footballers
J1 League players
FC Tokyo players
Vegalta Sendai players
Vissel Kobe players
Yokohama FC players
Association football midfielders